Alois Rohrmoser (July 11, 1932 in Grossarl, Austria, † 4, 2005 in Wagrain, Austria) is an Austrian Entrepreneurial leadership, and founder of Atomic Skis, in Altenmarkt im Pongau.

Career 
At age 23 he bought a small business and began production of wooden skis with four employees. He gradually expanded in Wagrain to industrial ski production. He was the bearer of the golden honorary mark of the province of Salzburg, bearer of the Golden Ehrenring and vice-mayor of Wagrain. In 1982, he was appointed a commercial councilor. He died of a heart attack in his home town.

References 

1932 births
2005 deaths
Austrian company founders